The Centro Oriental Rio-Grandense (Eastern Center of Rio Grande) is one of the seven Mesoregion of the state of Rio Grande do Sul in Brazil. It consists of 54 municipalities, grouped in three Microregions:
 Cachoeira do Sul
 Lajeado-Estrela
 Santa Cruz do Sul

References

Mesoregions of Rio Grande do Sul